TVP ABC is a television channel offered by Telewizja Polska. The programming is aimed at children aged 4–12, their parents, and their teachers.

Programs
 Bolek and Lolek
 Kuba and Sruba
 Margo the Mouse
 Reksio

Imported programs
  Postman Pat (Season 3-5)
 Pat and Mat

References 

Carousel (TV channel)
Rai Yoyo

External links 

Television channels in Poland
Television channels and stations established in 2013
Children's television networks
Telewizja Polska